The Saudi Arabian Royal Guard ( Al-Ḥars al-Malakī as-Suʿūdī) is a unit in the Saudi military forces. Originally an independent military force, the Royal Guards were incorporated into the Armed Forces since its inception until 1953. It is not to be confused with the SANG. However, the Royal Guards still retained their unique mission of protecting the House of Saud. Units of the Royal Guard protect the King of Saudi Arabia and other relatives at all times.

The Royal Guards report directly to the king and for security reasons maintain a separate communications network from the regular Army.

Members of the Royal Guard Regiment often wear the flowing white thaub (robe) and white kaffiyah and qhutrah (traditional Arab headgear of skullcap and scarf). Royal Guardsmen wear bright green berets when in conventional uniforms.

The Royal Guard Regiment consists of three light infantry battalions, based near Riyadh. The commander of the Royal Guard is General Suheil al-Mutiri.

Mission, Engagement and Responsibilities of the Royal Guard

Mission 
To carry out all procedures to ensure the security and protection of the King and the Crown Prince within and outside the Kingdom of Saudi Arabia and by using all available means to achieve this.

The head of the royal guard is directly linked to the Saudi king.

Duties 

 To provide security and guardianship of the King and Crown Prince wherever he may be in the Kingdom and abroad and in all his movements and means of transportation.
 Provide security and guardians to the King's guests wherever they are in the Kingdom.
 Providing security and guarding for all the places they visit within the Kingdom.
 Providing security and guarding for the King and his guests during celebrations and conferences held in the Kingdom in conjunction with other security services.
 To provide security and guard for all dawawins and royal palaces in different cities of the Kingdom.
 To provide security and guardianship to His Highness the Crown Prince while he is in the company of the King or wherever he is and falls under the responsibility of the Royal Guard.
 Follow-up all employees in the various royal courts and palaces, the Council of Ministers and all the places where the King is present and grant them entry cards to those places after being confirmed in security terms.
 Coordination with the Royal Protocol and the Office of Citizens' Affairs regarding the king's interviews with citizens and other dignitaries and foreigners.
 Perform any other duties that may be assigned to the Royal Guard.
 Provide security and guardians for members of the royal family and officials in the State when traveling on missions outside the Kingdom.
 Conducting all ceremonies for the reception and farewell of the guests of the Kingdom of Saudi Arabia within the Kingdom and the ceremony for the presentation of the credentials of the Ambassadors by the Honor Guards, Royal Protocol and Al-Fursan Guards.
 To carry out all ceremonies related to ceremonies and conferences attended by the King or his representative in the event that the officials so request.
 Coordinate with all the security services in the various celebrations and events held in the Kingdom to develop joint security plans to provide security and protection to the King and all his accompanying officials and VIPs.
 Participate with the other armed forces sectors in any combat operations appropriate to the tasks and arming the Royal Guard.

Uniforms 
The royal uniform of the Royal Guard consists of four models: the official form of the shirt, the dark green trousers, the green headgear, the green shirt, the combat model: the camouflage cap, Black hat and black hat for the unit and battalion of protection and promotion and the protection units close to the King and senior guests of kings and heads of state.

Ranks 
Officers

Enlisted

References 

Military units and formations of Saudi Arabia
19th century in Saudi Arabia
Guards regiments
Royal guards
Royal
Military units and formations established in 1803
1803 establishments in Asia
Protective security units
Law enforcement units
Guards of honour